Royal Canoe is a Canadian indie pop band from Winnipeg and Steinbach, Manitoba.

History
The band formed in 2010 from members of Manitoba bands The Waking Eyes, The Liptonians and TELE. They have toured with Alt-J and Bombay Bicycle Club. In 2014, Royal Canoe was nominated for Alternative Album of the Year at the Juno Awards. They also opened for Bombay Bicycle Club on their So Long, See You Tomorrow tour.

On 2 February 2013 Royal Canoe performed Beck's Song Reader project in full at the Winnipeg Symphony Orchestra's New Music Festival. (Beck released Song Reader on sheet music without a recorded version.)

Solo projects
In 2016, keyboardist Matthew Schellenberg composed, performed and produced songs for the soundtrack to the film Lovesick. At the 5th Canadian Screen Awards in 2017, he received a nomination for Best Original Song for "Draw Blood".

Matt Peters along with Tom Keenan formed the Winnipeg Chamber-pop ensemble Heavy Bell.  In January 2018 they released the album By Grand Central Station, a tribute to Canadian author Elizabeth Smart's 1945 novel By Grand Central Station I Sat Down and Wept.

Members
 Matt Peters - Vocals, keyboards, acoustic guitar 
 Bucky Driedger - Electric guitar, vocals 
 Matt Schellenberg - Keyboards, vocals 
 Brendan Berg - Bass, keyboard, vocals 
 Michael Jordan - Drums

Former member 
 Derek Allard - Drum kit

Discography
 Co-Op Mode (2010)
 Extended Play EP (2012)
 Purple & Gold 7 inch (2012)
 Today We're Believers (2013)
 Royal Canoe Does Beck's Song Reader (2014)
 Something Got Lost Between Here and the Orbit (2016)
 Waver (2019)
 RC3PO (2019)
 Sidelining (2021)
 Vault (2011 - 2021) (2022) (Compilation album of unreleased demos, B-sides and rareties)

References

External links

Royal Canoe Interview

Musical groups from Winnipeg
Canadian indie rock groups
Musical groups established in 2010
2010 establishments in Manitoba
Nettwerk Music Group artists
Paper Bag Records artists
Mennonite musicians